William Nuelsen Witney (May 15, 1915 – March 17, 2002) was an American film and television director. He is best remembered for the action films he made for Republic Pictures, particularly serials: Dick Tracy Returns, G-Men vs. the Black Dragon, Daredevils of the Red Circle, Zorro's Fighting Legion, and Drums of Fu Manchu. Prolific and pugnacious, Witney began directing while still in his 20s, and continued working until 1982.

Early years
Witney was born in Lawton, Oklahoma. He was four years old when his father died, and he lived with his uncle, who was an Army captain at Fort Sam Houston. Colbert Clark, Witney's brother-in-law, introduced him to films by letting him ride in some chase scenes for the serial Fighting with Kit Carson (1933). Witney stayed around the Mascot Pictures headquarters while preparing for the entrance exam to the U.S. Naval Academy. After he failed that exam, he continued at the studio.

In 1936 Mascot was absorbed by Republic, and Witney was now working for studio president Herbert Yates. He was an assistant on the serial The Painted Stallion when director Ray Taylor's drinking problem had gotten out of hand and Taylor had to leave the location. Witney replaced Taylor, and became a director permanently.

Witney teamed with director John English for several of Republic's most successful and best-remembered serials. Witney is credited with devising the modern system of filming movie fight sequences. Instead of filming a crowd of people wildly throwing punches at each other, as in a barroom brawl, Witney broke the action down into separate, carefully choreographed shots, which he patterned after the dance sequences in Fred Astaire-Ginger Rogers musicals.

During World War II he served in the US Marine Corps combat cameraman unit.

Quentin Tarantino has called him "one of the greatest action directors in the history of the business." Tarantino considers four films as Witney's best work: The Golden Stallion (1949), a Roy Rogers vehicle, Stranger at My Door (1956), The Bonnie Parker Story (1958), and Paratroop Command (1959).

Republic closed in 1957, forcing Witney to find freelance work, mostly in television. He directed the Jim Davis syndicated adventure television series, Rescue 8, which aired from 1958 to 1960. He became one of the staff directors of the CBS network series The Wild Wild West. Witney's serial experience was ideal for this series, which ended each quarter-hour with a suspenseful cliffhanger. He also made feature films into the 1960s, such as Master of the World (1961) starring Vincent Price and Charles Bronson.

Witney was married to former actress Maxine Doyle until her death in 1973. In his later years he was a popular speaker at film and nostalgia conventions. He died of a stroke in 2002.

Selected filmography

The Law of the Wild (1934) (serial) - assistant director
The Phantom Empire (1935) (serial) - assistant director
The Miracle Rider (1935) (serial) - editor
The Vigilantes Are Coming (1936) (serial) - assistant director, script supervisor
Darkest Africa (1936) (serial) - script supervisor
Red River Valley (1936) - script supervisor
Robinson Crusoe of Clipper Island (1936) (serial) - editor
Dick Tracy (1937) (serial) - editor, 2nd unit director
 The Painted Stallion (1937) (serial) - director
 S.O.S. Coast Guard (1937) (serial) - director
 The Trigger Trio (1937) - director
 Zorro Rides Again (1937) (serial) - director
 The Lone Ranger (1938) (serial) - director - edited into the feature Hi Yo Silver! (1940)
 The Fighting Devil Dogs (1938) (serial) - director
 Dick Tracy Returns (1938) (serial)  - director
 Hawk of the Wilderness (1938) (serial) - director
 The Lone Ranger Rides Again (1939) (serial) - director
 Zorro's Fighting Legion (1939) (serial) - director
 Daredevils of the Red Circle (1939) (serial) - director
 Dick Tracy's G-Men (1939) (serial) - director
 Heroes of the Saddle (1940) - director
 Drums of Fu Manchu (1940) (serial) - director
 Adventures of Red Ryder (1940) (serial) - director
 King of the Royal Mounted (1940) (serial) - director
 Mysterious Doctor Satan (1940) (serial) - director
 Adventures of Captain Marvel (1941) (serial) - director
 Jungle Girl (1941) (serial) - director
 King of the Texas Rangers (1941) (serial) - director
 Dick Tracy vs. Crime, Inc. (1941) (serial) - director
 Spy Smasher (1942) (serial) - director
The Girl from Alaska (1942) - director (uncredited)
 Perils of Nyoka (1942) (serial) - director
 King of the Mounties (1942) (serial) - director
Outlaws of Pine Ridge (1942) - director
 G-Men vs. the Black Dragon (1943) (serial) - director
Roll on Texas Moon (1946) - director
Home in Oklahoma (1946) - director
 The Crimson Ghost (1946) (serial) - director
Heldorado (1946) - director
Apache Rose (1947) - director
Bells of San Angelo (1947) - director
Springtime in the Sierras (1947) - director
On the Old Spanish Trail (1947) - director
The Gay Ranchero (1948) - director
Under California Skies (1948) - director
 Eyes of Texas (1948) - director
 Night Time in Nevada (1948) - director
Grand Canyon Trail (1948) - director
The Far Frontier (1948) - director
Susanna Pass (1949) - director
Down Dakota Way (1949) - director
Land of Opportunity: The American Rodeo (1949) (documentary) - director
 The Golden Stallion (1949) - director
Land of Opportunity: The Sponge Driver (1949) (documentary) - director
Bells of Coronado (1950) - director
Land of Opportunity: Tillers of the Soil (1950) (documentary) - director
Land of Opportunity: Mardi Gras (1950) (documentary) - director
Twilight in the Sierras (1950) - director
Trigger, Jr. (1950) - director
Sunset in the West (1950) - director
North of the Great Divide (1950) - director
 Trail of Robin Hood (1950) - director
Spoilers of the Plains (1951) - director
The Wild Blue Yonder (1951) - actor
Heart of the Rockies (1951) - director
In Old Amarillo (1951) - director
South of Caliente (1951) - director
Pals of the Golden West (1951) - director
Colorado Sundown (1952) - director
 The Last Musketeer (1952) - director
 Border Saddlemates (1952) - director
 Old Oklahoma Plains (1952) - director
 The WAC from Walla Walla (1952) - director
 South Pacific Trail (1952) - director
 Old Overland Trail (1953) - director
 Iron Mountain Trail (1953) - director
Down Laredo Way (1953) - director
 Shadows of Tombstone (1953) - director
The Outcast (1954) - director
Stories of the Century (1954–55) (TV series) - director
 Santa Fe Passage (1955) - director
The Last Command (1955) - 2nd unit director
 City of Shadows (1955) - director
 Headline Hunters (1955) - director
 The Fighting Chance (1955) - director
 The Last Command (1955) (battle scenes)
Stranger at My Door (1956) - director
 A Strange Adventure (1956) - director
 Panama Sal (1957) - director
Zorro (1958–60) (TV series) - director
 The Cool and the Crazy (1958) - director
 Juvenile Jungle (1958) - director
 Young and Wild (1958) - director
 The Bonnie Parker Story (1958) - director
Mike Hammer (1959) (TV series)  - director
Special Agent 7 (1959) (TV series) - director
Lassie (1959) (TV series) - director
Paratroop Command (1959) - director
Sky King (1959) (TV series) - director
Rescue 8 (1959) (TV series) - director
State Trooper (1959) (TV series) - director
Frontier Doctor (1956–59) (TV series) - director
Riverboat (1959–60) (TV series) - director
Wagon Train (1959–65) (TV series) - director
 Valley of the Redwoods (1960) - director
Overland Trail (1960) (TV series) - director
 The Secret of the Purple Reef (1960) - director
M Squad (1960) (TV series) - director
The Tall Man (1961) (TV series) - editor, director
Coronado 9 (1960–61) (TV series) - director
 The Long Rope (1961) - director
 The Cat Burglar (1961) - director
 Master of the World (1961) - director
Frontier Circus (1961–62) (TV series) - director
Tales of Wells Fargo (1961–62) (TV series) - director
Mr. Hobbs Takes a Vacation (1962) - 2nd unit director
The Virginian (1962–69) (TV series) - director
Wide Country (1963) (TV series) - director
Laramie (1963) (TV series) - director
The Alfred Hitchcock Hour (1964) (TV series) - director
Marnie (1964) - 2nd unit director
Destry (1964) (TV series) - director
Apache Rifles (1964) - director
The Girls on the Beach (1965) - director
 Arizona Raiders (1965) - director
The Wild Wild West (1965) (TV series) - director
Branded (1966) (TV series) - director
Laredo (1966–67) (TV series) - director
Daniel Boone (1966–67) (TV series) - director
Bonanza (1966) (TV series) - director
 40 Guns to Apache Pass (1967) - director
Hondo (1967) (TV series) - director
Tarzan (1967–68) (TV series) - director
The High Chaparral (1967–68) (TV series) - director
 I Escaped from Devil's Island (1973) - director
The Cowboys (1974) (TV series) - director
Kodiak (TV series) - director
 Darktown Strutters (1974) - director
Quell and Co. (1982) aka Showdown at Eagle Gap - director, actor

References

Further reading
 
 ASIN B0006EYMSG.

External links

William Witney's Bio
William Witney's web site

1915 births
2002 deaths
Film serial crew
People from Lawton, Oklahoma
Film directors from Oklahoma